Ellerbe Becket is an independent Minneapolis, Minnesota-based architectural, engineering, interior design and construction firm until 2009, when it was acquired by AECOM. AECOM is ranked as one of the world's largest architectural firms, with offices  in Dallas, TX, Kansas City, MO,  San Francisco, CA, Washington, DC, Dubai, United Arab Emirates and Doha, Qatar.

The firm currently employs 475 people in seven locations and three countries, and has designed buildings in all of the 50 states and in 20 countries.

History
The company originally called Ellerbe & Co. was founded by Franklin Ellerbe in 1909 in St. Paul, Minnesota. Its first clients included the Mayo Clinic and 3M.  Thomas Ellerbe took over the company in 1921 upon his father's death. When he retired in 1966 it became an employee-owned company. In 1988 it merged with Welton Becket and Associates of Los Angeles and became Ellerbe Becket. In 1988 it opened a sports design division in Kansas City. On October 26, 2009 Ellerbe Becket joined the architecture, planning, and engineering firm AECOM.

Projects

General buildings
Ronald Reagan Building, Washington, DC
Carlson School of Management - University of Minnesota, Minneapolis, MN
Kingdom Centre, Riyadh, Saudi Arabia
Target Plaza South and North, Minneapolis, MN
Science Museum of Minnesota St. Paul, MN
Brasil Telecom Data Center, Brasilia, Brazil
Charles Evans Whittaker Federal Courthouse, Kansas City, MO
 Hesburgh Library, 1963
 O'Shaughnessy Hall (1953), North Dining Hall (1957), Keenan Hall and Stanford Hall (1957), Stepan Center (1962), Lewis Hall (1965), Galvin Life Science (1967), Grace and Flanner Halls (1969), Fitzpatrick Hall of Engineering (1974), Snite Museum of Art (1980), Pasquerilla West (1980), Pasquerilla East (1981), Stepan Chemistry Hall (1982), Decio Faculty Hall (1984), Siegfried Hall (1988), Knott Hall (1988), Pasquerilla Center (1990), Ricci Band Building (1990), Hesburgh Center for International Studies (1991), DeBartolo Hall (1992), Mendoza College of Business (1996), O'Neill Hall (1996), Keough Hall (1996), McGlinn Hall (1997), Welsh Family Hall (1997) at the University of Notre Dame

Health care
Yonsei University Medical Center - Severance Hospital, Seoul, Korea
Khalifa Sport City - Orthopedic Sports Medicine Hospital, Doha, Qatar This is now Aspetar
Walt Disney Memorial Cancer Institute, Orlando, FL
Mercy Medical Center, Baltimore, MD
Mayo Clinic, Rochester, MN
Sanford Health, Sioux Falls, SD
St. Luke's Hospital Nassif Heart Center, Cedar Rapids, IA
St. Rita's Medical Center, Lima, OH
Stonewall Jackson Hospital, Lexington, VA
Gonda Building, Rochester, MN
Regions Hospital (2009 expansion & cafeteria renovation), St. Paul, MN
Mercy Clinic and Hospital (expansion 1950s), Oskaloosa, Iowa

Sports facilities
The following were designed by the Kansas City Sports Venue branch

Stadiums

Notre Dame Stadium (and renovation), Notre Dame, IN
CenturyLink Field, Seattle, WA
Centennial Olympic Stadium/Turner Field (now Georgia State Stadium), Atlanta, GA
Faurot Field (renovation), Columbia, MO
Guangdong Olympic Stadium, Guangzhou, China
Lambeau Field (renovation), Green Bay, WI
Rentschler Field, East Hartford, CT
Rhodes Stadium, Elon, NC
Chase Field, Phoenix, AZ
Autzen Stadium (renovation), Eugene, OR
Foreman Field (renovation), Norfolk, VA
Sam Boyd Stadium (renovation), Las Vegas, NV
Johnny Unitas Stadium (renovation), Towson, MD
Frontier Field, Rochester, NY

Arenas

AT&T Center (formerly SBC Center), San Antonio, TX
Barclays Center, Brooklyn, NY
BB&T Center (formerly Office Depot Center), Sunrise, FL
Dunkin' Donuts Center (formerly Providence Civic Center), Providence, RI
FedExForum, Memphis, TN
Gainbridge Fieldhouse, (formerly Conseco Fieldhouse and Bankers Life Fieldhouse), Indianapolis, IN
JQH Arena, Springfield, MO
John Paul Jones Arena, Charlottesville, VA
Joyce Center, Notre Dame, IN
KeyBank Center, Buffalo, NY
König Pilsener Arena, Oberhausen, Germany
Madison Square Garden, New York City, New York (1990s renovation)
Manchester Arena (formerly Manchester Evening News Arena), Manchester, England
Matthew Knight Arena, Eugene, OR
Moda Center, Portland, OR
Rocket Mortgage FieldHouse (formerly Gund Arena and Quicken Loans Arena), Cleveland, OH
Saitama Super Arena, Saitama, Japan
Enterprise Center (formerly Scottrade Center), St. Louis, MO
Spokane Veterans Memorial Arena, Spokane, WA
Sprint Center, Kansas City, MO
Amalie Arena, Tampa, FL
Vibrant Arena at The MARK, (formerly)  The MARK of the Quad Cities,  i Wireless Center, and TaxSlayer Center),  Moline, Illinois
Talking Stick Resort Arena (formerly America West Arena and US Airways Center), Phoenix, AZ
TD Garden (formerly FleetCenter), Boston, MA
Thomas & Mack Center, Paradise, NV
Capital One Arena (formerly MCI Center and Verizon Center), Washington, DC
Wells Fargo Center, Philadelphia, PA
XFINITY Center (formerly Comcast Center), College Park, MD

References

External links
AECOM website
CBS article about Superdome renovation by Ellerbe Becket

Defunct architecture firms based in Minnesota
Design companies established in 1909
1909 establishments in Minnesota
Defunct companies based in Minneapolis
2009 mergers and acquisitions